John MacGregor "Mac" Marshall (born January 27, 1996) is an American professional baseball pitcher in the San Francisco Giants organization.

Career
Marshall attended Parkview High School in Lilburn, Georgia. He committed to attend Louisiana State University (LSU) to play college baseball for the LSU Tigers.

Though Marshall was considered one of the best available prospects in the 2014 Major League Baseball draft, his signing bonus demands led him to fall lower in the draft. The Houston Astros selected Marshall in the 21st round. The Astros reached Marshall's demand of a $1.5 million signing bonus. However, when the Astros' deal with Brady Aiken fell through due to problems with Aiken's medical exam, the Astros were unable to sign Marshall and Jacob Nix without incurring penalties. Marshall decided not to attend LSU, instead choosing to attend Chipola College (a junior college), making him eligible for the 2015 MLB draft.

Marshall consented to allow the Astros to select him in 2015; however, the San Francisco Giants selected him in the fourth round (126th overall selection). Marshall signed with the Giants, receiving a $750,000 signing bonus. He pitched in two games for the Arizona Giants of the Rookie-level Arizona League, and was promoted to the Salem-Keizer Volcanoes of the Class A-Short Season Northwest League. In nine games between Arizona and Salem-Keizer in 2015, Marshall posted a 5.23 earned run average (ERA), striking out 29 in  innings. He spent 2016 with both Salem-Keizer and the Augusta GreenJackets of the Class A South Atlantic League, posting a combined 1–6 record, with a 4.70 ERA in 17 starts. In 2017, Marshall only pitched  innings, for the Arizona Giants, due to surgery to repair an ulnar nerve subluxation. In 2018, he pitched for the San Jose Giants of the Class A-Advanced California League, going 0-6 with a 5.43 ERA and a 1.54 WHIP in 19 games (18 starts).

References

External links

1996 births
Living people
Sportspeople from the Atlanta metropolitan area
Baseball players from Georgia (U.S. state)
Baseball pitchers
People from Lilburn, Georgia
Chipola Indians baseball players
Arizona League Giants players
Salem-Keizer Volcanoes players
Augusta GreenJackets players
Minor league baseball players
San Jose Giants players